This is a list of public art in the Royal Borough of Kensington and Chelsea.


Belgravia
See the list of public art in Belgravia.

Brompton

Chelsea

Chelsea Embankment

Kensington
See the list of public art in Kensington and the list of public art in Kensington Gardens.

Knightsbridge
See the list of public art in Knightsbridge.

Ladbroke Grove

References

Bibliography

 

 
 01–19 (PDF)
 20–39 (PDF)
 40–47 (PDF)
 48–64 (PDF)
 65–79 (PDF)
 80–93 (PDF)

External links
 

 
Kensington and Chelsea
Tourist attractions in the Royal Borough of Kensington and Chelsea